Shekhar Suman (born 7 December 1962) is an Indian actor, anchor, producer, director, and singer.

Personal life
Shekhar Suman married Alka Suman on 4 May 1983, and has a son  Adhyayan Suman, a Bollywood film actor. An older son, Aayush, died of a heart ailment at age 11.

Career

Suman debuted in films with the Utsav opposite Rekha, produced by Shashi Kapoor and directed by Girish Karnad. He has worked in nearly 35 films including Manav Hatya, Naache Mayuri, Sansar, Anubhav, Tridev, Pati Parmeshwar, and Ranbhoomi.

In television, he acted in Wah Janaab with Kiran Juneja. His television career included shows like Dekh Bhai Dekh, Reporter, Kabhi Idhar Kabhi Udhar, Chote Babu, Andaz, Amar Prem, Vilayati Babu, Movers n Shakers, Simply Shekhar and Carry On Shekhar. He hosted Film Deewane, The Great Indian Comedy Show on Star One until February 2006 and appeared in some episodes of Dial One Aur Jeeto on Sahara TV. He has also hosted quiz shows including Nilaam Ghar on Zee TV, He-Man on Star One and Poll Khol on STAR News. In 2015, he began hosting Abki Bari Shekhar Bihari on Aaj Tak.

He was one of the judges of The Great Indian Laughter Challenge along with Navjot Singh Sidhu, quitting after three seasons over differences with his co-host. He featured as a judge on several other comedy shows such as Comedy Circus on Sony TV and Comedy Superstar on SAB TV. He hosted the show Jab Khelo SAB Khelo on SAB TV and participated in the fourth season of the popular dance reality show, Jhalak Dikhhla Jaa which aired on Sony TV.

He made his singing debut with a music album named, Kuch Khwaab Aise, a collection of eight love ballads whose music was composed by Aadesh Shrivastava and lyrics written by Shyam Raj. In December 2009, he appeared as a participant on the reality TV series, Raaz Pichhle Janam Ka, based on past life regression. Suman made his directorial debut with 2014 film, Heartless.

Suman fought Lok Sabha election in May 2009 from Patna Sahib on Congress ticket and lost to BJP's Shatrughan Sinha, coming up in third place.

Filmography

Television
{| class="wikitable sortable"
|-
! Title
! Role
|-
|Chote Babu
|
|-
|Comedy Circus
|Judge
|-
|Comedy Superstar
| Judge
|-
| Dam Dama Dam
| Sarju/Chichi/Sonu/Karan
|-
|Dekh Bhai Dekh
| Sameer Diwan
|-
| Reporter
| Sameer
|-
| Ek Raja Ek Rani
| Ajay Kapoor
|-
|Vilayati Babu
| Shanty
|-
|Neelam Ghar
|Host
|-
| The Great Indian Comedy Show
| Host
|-
| The Great Indian Laughter Challenge
| Judge
|-
| He Man
|Host
|-
| Hera Pheri
| Ajay Premi
|-
|  India's Laughter Champion
| Judge
|-
|Jjhoom India
|Contestant
|-
| Laugh India Laugh| Judge
|-
| Made in India| Host
|-
|Main|Viren Kumar
|-
|Movers & Shakers| Host 
|-
|Poll Khol|  Host 
|-
|Saat Pheron Ki Hera Pherie| Bhoopi Tandon 
|-
|  Simply Shekhar| Host
|-
|  Tedhi Baat Shekhar Ke Saath| Various characters
|-
|Wah Janaab|
|-
|Bigg Boss 16|Big bulletin Host
|}

Awards
 Won Best Anchor for Movers And Shakers at 1st ITA Awards
 Won Best Anchor for Carry on Shekhar at 3rd Indian Telly Awards
 Won Bollywood Movie Award for Best Comedian, Chor Machaaye Shor''

References

External links

 
 

Living people
People from Bihar
Indian male film actors
Indian male comedians
Indian male voice actors
Male actors in Hindi cinema
Indian television presenters
Male actors from Patna
St. Xavier's Patna alumni
1962 births
Male actors in Hindi television
21st-century Indian male actors
20th-century Indian male actors